{{chembox
| Verifiedfields = changed
| Watchedfields = changed
| verifiedrevid = 450502843
| Reference = <ref name="Science">Science. 1969, vol. 166 pp.1010-1012</ref>
| Name = Grandisol
| ImageFile = Grandisol.png
| ImageSize = 140px
| ImageAlt = Skeletal formula of grandisol
| ImageFile1 = Grandisol 3D ball.png
| ImageSize1 = 160
| ImageAlt1 = Ball-and-stick model of the grandisol molecule
| PIN = 2-[(1R,2S)-1-Methyl-2-(prop-1-en-2-yl)cyclobutyl]ethan-1-ol
| OtherNames = cis-2-Isopropenyl-1-methylcyclobutaneethanol
|Section1=
|Section2=
}}

Grandisol is a natural organic compound with the molecular formula C10H18O. It is a monoterpene containing a cyclobutane ring, an alcohol group, an alkene group and two chiral centers (one of which is quaternary).

Grandisol is a pheromone primarily important as the sex attractant of the cotton boll weevil (Anthonomus grandis), from which it gets its name.  It is also a pheromone for other related insects.  The cotton boll weevil is an agricultural pest that can cause significant economic damage if not controlled.  Grandisol is the major constituent of the mixture known as grandlure, which is used to protect cotton crops from the boll weevil.

Synthesis
Grandisol was first isolated, identified, and synthesized by J. Tumlinson et al''. at Mississippi State University in 1969. The most recent and highest yielding synthetic route to grandisol was reported in January 2010 by a group of chemists at Furman University. Though enantioselective syntheses have been reported, racemic grandisol has proven equally effective at attracting boll weevils as the natural enantiomer, rendering moot the need for enantioselective syntheses for agricultural purposes.

References 

Insect pheromones
Primary alcohols
Isopropenyl compounds
Cyclobutanes
Monoterpenes